Diána Kőszegi (born 14 August1983 in Hungary) is the first Hungarian professional Go player. She became the sixth European professional player since she was promoted by the Korean Go Association on 4 January 2008.

Biography

 
Diána Kőszegi was born in August 1983 in Budapest. She began playing Go at age of 9. She was initially taught by her father, Sándor Kőszegi, who also teaches Go to elementary schools students. At age 11, she began studying under Tibor Pocsai, the winner of the European Go Championship in 1988. During this time, she started to teach Go on the KGS Go Server.

In 1996, she met 9 dan professional Yasutoshi Yasuda, with whom she kept in contact and Shigeno Yuki, a friend who Diána considers as close as a sister. Diána wanted to be Yasuda's pupil, but was not able to be. Both Yasuda and Yuki had a big influence with her.

When Kőszegi was 14, she came 4th at the 1st World Women Amateur Baduk Championship, held in 1997 in Seoul. In the following autumn, she finished 2nd in the 2nd European Women Amateur Go Championship.

She came in 9th at the female equivalent of the World Amateur Go Championship in 1998 and was invited to Japan and Korea to study as an insei. Her family did not let her go because of her young age.

In March 2000, she won the European Youth Go Championship that was held in Sinaia. She came in 2nd in the previous two years, and again in 2001. In the same year, even though she finished only joint 8th at the Hungarian Go Championship, winning the play-offs between the top 6, she became the Hungarian Go Champion. She was the first Hungarian invited to professional competitions in China, while still an amateur. Representing Europe, she entered three competitions in 2000 (Shanghai), 2001 (Guiyang), and 2002 (Hong Kong).

Since 2001, she has continued studying Go without a tutor. In 2001, she stayed in Japan for 1.5 months,thanks to her sister and brother Kobayashi Chizu and Kobayashi Satoru. In 2003, she went to the Hungarian university ELTE. She studied at the programming mathematician department, but she was not able to complete her course,because of an invitation from the KimWon Baduk Academy, thanks to Mr Eo Jong Soo (7 dan Korean). She got to know him at the World Championship held in Korea in 2003.

She went to Korea in 2004 for three months, but then returned because she could not extend her visa. Until Kőszegi was promoted to professional from 2005 as an insei she was competing at the league in Seoul. In 2005, she studied at the Korean Myongji University and started teaching Go online.

She translated the Go book 21st Century New Openings, by Kim Sung Rae (4 Dan), into English.

Promotion record

See also 

 List of Go organizations

References

External links
 Diána's page on the Hungarian Go Wiki

1983 births
Living people
Hungarian Go players
Female Go players